The Forest Avenue station is a station on the BMT Myrtle Avenue Line of the New York City Subway. Located on a private right-of-way in Ridgewood, Queens, the station is served by the M train at all times. The station opened in 1915 as part of the Dual Contracts.

History
This station opened on February 22, 1915 by the Brooklyn Rapid Transit Company as part of a project to elevate a portion of the Myrtle Avenue Line, which had run at street level. This work was completed as part of the Dual Contracts. The Myrtle Avenue Elevated line was already extended to Middle Village nine years earlier. The station was acquired by Brooklyn Manhattan Transit Company in 1923, and later by the New York City Board of Transportation in 1940.

Station layout

This elevated station has two tracks and an island platform. The canopy is metal while the mezzanine under the station is wood.

Exits
The only open exit is at the east end of the station. Stairs from the platform lead down to a mezzanine below the tracks, from which two stairs lead to the western side of Forest Avenue on opposite sides of the intersection of Fairview and Putnam Avenues. There was also an exit at the west end that led to Woodward Avenue.

References

External links 
 
 Station Reporter — M Train
 The Subway Nut — Forest Avenue Pictures 
 Putnam Avenue entrance (near Forest Avenue) from Google Maps Street View
 Platform from Google Maps Street View

BMT Myrtle Avenue Line stations
New York City Subway stations in Queens, New York
Railway stations in the United States opened in 1915
1915 establishments in New York City
Ridgewood, Queens